Johnnie To is a Hong Kong film director and producer.

He has contributed to many projects, as a producer, director or a combination of the two. He made his directorial debut in 1980, when he directed The Enigmatic Case, a film starring Damian Lau.  Beginning in 1996, To began producing and directing films under the independent production banner Milkyway Image, a company that he co-founded with frequent collaborator Wai Ka-Fai. Commercially successful in his native Hong Kong, To's films have regularly appeared at international film festivals, most notably in Europe and North America.

To's biggest international successes include  Breaking News, Election, Election 2 (a.k.a. Triad Election), Exiled, Mad Detective and Drug War; these films have been distributed theatrically in France and the United States and widely sold to foreign countries.

Filmography

Films

Other work 

Sources:

References

External links

Johnnie To at LoveHKFilm.com

Director filmographies
Hong Kong filmographies
British filmographies